The International Convention on the Protection of Birds (French: Convention internationale sur la protection (des) oiseaux) is an animal welfare treaty signed in Paris on 18 October 1950, ratified in 1953 by Austria, France, Greece and Monaco, and entered into effect on 17 January 1963 for 13 European countries. It followed the International Convention for the Protection of Birds that are Useful for Agriculture that was signed in Paris on 19 March 1902 (which remains effective, but has been rendered completely obsolete by later treaties), to extend to all species of birds. The text of the treaty was modified for the first time on 1 September 1973, and a second time on 30 March 2016.

The Convention established the principle that all birds, except for a small number of species, must be protected. It does not contain a list of species entitled to protection. Parties are required to maintain closed seasons for game birds (mostly during the spring migration), comply with certain hunting method regulations, and encouraged to establish bird reserves.

According to the then-Governor of the International Council of Environmental Law Cyril de Klemm (1989), the Convention "has been largely ineffective", mostly due to the relatively small number of countries that have ratified it. Instead, the Berne Convention on the Conservation of European Wildlife and Natural Habitats (signed in 1979, effective in 1982) had become the "main international instrument for the protection for European birds".

See also 
 Agreement on the Conservation of Albatrosses and Petrels
 Animal rights by country or territory
 Bird conservation
 List of international animal welfare conventions
 Migratory Bird Treaty between Canada and the United States

References

External links 
 Convention internationale sur la protection des oiseaux, French text of the 2016 version (PDF)
 English translation of the French text of the 1950 version
 Convention internationale sur la protection des oiseaux, French text of the 1950 version 

1950 in France
Animal treaties
Animal welfare and rights legislation
Bird conservation
Council of Europe treaties
Environmental treaties
Fauna of Europe
Treaties concluded in 1950
Treaties entered into force in 1963
Treaties of Austria
Treaties of Belgium
Treaties of Bulgaria
Treaties of France
Treaties of Greece
Treaties of Iceland
Treaties of Italy
Treaties of Luxembourg
Treaties of Monaco
Treaties of the Netherlands
Treaties of Portugal
Treaties of Serbia
Treaties of Spain
Treaties of Sweden
Treaties of Switzerland
Treaties of Turkey